Mid Airlines is a charter airline based in Khartoum, Sudan. It operates domestic passenger services. Its main base is Khartoum International Airport.

History
The airline was established in 2002 and started operations in May 2003.

Destinations
Mid Airlines operates scheduled domestic destinations to Khartoum, Rumbek, and Port Sudan (as of January 2005), although it appears as of June 2016 that this is no longer the case and that the airline presently offers an array of domestic and international charter services.

Fleet
The Mid Airlines fleet includes the following aircraft (as of August 2013):

2 Fokker 50

References

External links
Mid Airlines
Mid Airlines Fleet

Airlines banned in the European Union
Airlines of Sudan
Airlines established in 2002
2002 establishments in Sudan
Companies based in Khartoum